Akṣayakumāra, also known as Mahabali Akshya in various languages, was the youngest son of Ravana and the brother of Meghanada. In the Ramayana, when Hanuman started destroying Ashoka Vatika after a conversation with Sita, Ravana sent him to the head of a Rakshasa army to take care of it. A warrior of just sixteen, he took the gaze of his father as his command and left for battle in his chariot. He fought with Hanuman, aiming various weapons at him. Though highly impressed by the young prince's valor and skills, Hanuman killed him in the end.

References

External links
Canto XLVII. The Death Of Aksha

Rakshasa in the Ramayana
Characters in the Ramayana